Delnice is a town in western Croatia, the largest settlement in the mountainous region of Gorski Kotar, in the Primorje-Gorski Kotar County. The town has a population of 4,379, and total municipality population is 5,952 (2011). Delnice is Gorski Kotar's main town.

Demographics

The municipality consists of the following settlements:

 Bela Vodica, population 24
 Belo, population 9
 Biljevina, population 4
 Brod na Kupi, population 207
 Crni Lug, population 253
 Čedanj, population 9
 Dedin, population 93
 Delnice, population 4,379
 Donja Krašićevica, no population
 Donje Tihovo, population 5
 Donji Ložac, population 6
 Donji Okrug, population 2
 Donji Turni, no population
 Gašparci, population 15
 Golik, population 16
 Gornja Krašićevica, population 2
 Gornje Tihovo, population 6
 Gornji Ložac, population 10
 Gornji Okrug, population 2
 Gornji Turni, population 13
 Grbajel, population 17
 Guče Selo, population 27
 Gusti Laz, population 4
 Hrvatsko, population 49
 Iševnica, population 9
 Kalić, population 4
 Kočičin, population 1
 Krivac, population 23
 Kupa, population 8
 Kuželj, population 52
 Leska, population 3
 Lučice, population 332
 Mala Lešnica, population 8
 Malo Selo, population 62
 Marija Trošt, population 46
 Plajzi, no population
 Podgora Turkovska, population 8
 Požar, population 8
 Radočaj Brodski, population 40
 Raskrižje Tihovo, population 7
 Razloge, population 8
 Razloški Okrug, population 5
 Sedalce, population 16
 Srednja Krašićevica, no population
 Suhor, no population
 Ševalj, no population
 Turke, population 31
 Velika Lešnica, population 16
 Velika Voda, no population
 Zagolik, no population
 Zakrajc Turkovski, population 2
 Zalesina, population 41
 Zamost Brodski, population 36
 Zapolje Brodsko, population 34
 Zelin Crnoluški, no population

History
The town was first mentioned in a 1482 document issued by Sabor, the Croatian Parliament.
 
In the late 19th and early 20th centuries, Delnice was a district capital in the Modruš-Rijeka County of the Kingdom of Croatia-Slavonia.

Transportation
Delnice is well connected to numerous local and national destinations by train and bus. Rijeka (Croatia's third largest city) is half an hour away by road.

Tourism
Delnice, along with the surrounding county of Gorski Kotar's pristine nature offer a plethora of outdoor opportunities for an active vacation. Some of the activities include Cycling, Mountain Climbing, Rock Climbing,  Running, Hiking, Cross Country running, Skiing, Cross Country Skiing, Snowboarding, Camping, Kayaking, River Rafting and Hunting. Delnice has many shops, bars and restaurants.

References

External links

History of Delnice
Tourist information

Cities and towns in Croatia
Populated places in Primorje-Gorski Kotar County
Modruš-Rijeka County
1482 establishments in Europe
15th-century establishments in Croatia